In conformal differential geometry, a conformal connection is a Cartan connection on an n-dimensional manifold M arising as a deformation of the Klein geometry given by the celestial n-sphere, viewed as the homogeneous space 

O+(n+1,1)/P 

where P is the stabilizer of a fixed null line through the origin in Rn+2, in the orthochronous Lorentz group O+(n+1,1) in n+2 dimensions.

Normal Cartan connection
Any manifold equipped with a conformal structure has a canonical conformal connection called the normal Cartan connection.

Formal definition

A conformal connection on an n-manifold M is a Cartan geometry modelled on the conformal sphere, where the latter is viewed as a homogeneous space for O+(n+1,1). In other words it is an O+(n+1,1)-bundle equipped with
 a O+(n+1,1)-connection (the Cartan connection)
 a reduction of structure group to the stabilizer of a point in the conformal sphere (a null line in Rn+1,1)
such that the solder form induced by these data is an isomorphism.

References
Le, Anbo. "Cartan connections for CR manifolds." manuscripta mathematica 122.2 (2007): 245-264.

External links

Conformal geometry
Connection (mathematics)